La Concordia may refer to:

 La Concordia, Ecuador, the capital of La Concordia Canton, Ecuador
 La Concordia, Chiapas, a municipality and a town in Chiapas, Mexico
 La Concordia, Jinotega, a municipality in Jinotega department, Nicaragua
 La Concordia, Uruguay, a village in Soriano department, Uruguay